The 2011 Barcelona Ladies Open was a tennis tournament played on outdoor clay courts. It was the 5th edition of the Barcelona Ladies Open, and an International-level tournament on the 2011 WTA Tour. It took place at the Tennis de la Vall d'Hebron in Barcelona, Catalonia, Spain, from April 25 through May 1, 2011.

Entrants

Seeds 

 Rankings are as of April 18, 2011.

Other entrants 
The following players received wildcards into the main draw:
  Marion Bartoli
  Nuria Llagostera Vives
  María-Teresa Torró-Flor

The following players received entry from the qualifying draw:

  Estrella Cabeza Candela
  Chang Kai-chen
  Zuzana Kučová
  Silvia Soler Espinosa

The following players received entry from a lucky loser spot:
  Maria Elena Camerin
  Jamie Hampton

Withdrawals 
  Timea Bacsinszky (ankle injury)
  Lourdes Domínguez Lino ''(foot injury)

Champions

Singles 

 Roberta Vinci def.  Lucie Hradecká, 4–6, 6–2, 6–2
It was Vinci's 1st title of the year and 4th of her career. It was her 2nd win at the event, also winning in 2009.

Doubles 

 Iveta Benešová /  Barbora Záhlavová-Strýcová def.  Natalie Grandin /  Vladimíra Uhlířová, 5–7, 6–4, [11–9]

External links 
 

       
Barcelona Ladies Open
Barcelona Ladies Open
Open
Bar